Qaleh-ye Now-e Kavar (also Romanized as Qal‘eh-ye Now-e Kavār and Qal‘eh Now-e Kavār; also known as Ghal‘eh Now Kawar, Qal‘eh Now, and Qal‘eh-ye Now) is a village in Kavar Rural District, in the Central District of Kavar County, Fars Province, Iran. At the 2006 census, its population was 217, in 55 families.

References 

Populated places in Kavar County